Conifaber is a genus of spiders in the family Uloboridae. It was first described in 1982 by Opell. , it contains 4 species, all from South America:

 Conifaber guarani Grismado, 2004 — Paraguay, Argentina
 Conifaber manicoba Salvatierra, Brescovit & Tourinho, 2017 — Brazil
 Conifaber parvus Opell, in Lubin et al., 1982 — Colombia
 Conifaber yasi Grismado, 2004 — Argentina

References

Uloboridae
Araneomorphae genera
Spiders of South America